Einar Vaardal-Lunde (1915–2003) was a Norwegian architect.

Vaardal-Lunde was educated at the Norwegian Institute of Technology, graduating in 1940. After World War II, he participated in the rebuilding efforts and reconstruction in Finnmark until 1948. In 1948, he began his own architectural firm in partnership with Torgeir Alvsaker. In 1970, he opened his own architectural firm called . He designed a number of public buildings (hotels, churches, hospitals, and others), mostly in Western Norway.

Works
 Ostereidet Church
 Vike Church
 Nygård Church
 Strusshamn Church
 Fjell Church
 Store-Kalsøy Chapel

References

1915 births
2003 deaths
Architects from Bergen
Norwegian ecclesiastical architects
20th-century Norwegian architects